The 2017–18 Hartford Hawks women's basketball team will represent the University of Hartford during the 2017–18 NCAA Division I women's basketball season. The Hawks, led by second year head coach Kim McNeill and will once again play their home games in the Chase Arena at Reich Family Pavilion and are members of the America East Conference.

Media
All home games and conference road games will stream on either ESPN3 or AmericaEast.tv. Most road games will stream on the opponents website. All games will be broadcast on the radio on WWUH.

Roster

Schedule

|-
!colspan=9 style="background:#; color:#FFFFFF;"| Non-conference regular season

|-
!colspan=9 style="background:#; color:#FFFFFF;"| America East regular season

|-
!colspan=9 style="background:#; color:#FFFFFF;"| America East Women's Tournament

See also
 2017–18 Hartford Hawks men's basketball team

References

Hartford Hawks women's basketball seasons
Hartford
Hartford Hawks women's b
Hartford Hawks women's b